"Todo No Fue Suficiente" is a song written and recorded by the American musical duo Ha*Ash and is the tenth track from Ha*Ash's fourth studio album A Tiempo where it was released as the third single from the album on January 2, 2012, and then included on their live album Ha*Ash: En Vivo (2019). It was written by Ashley Grace, Hanna Nicole and Yoel Henríquez.

Background and release 
"Todo No Fue Suficiente" it was written by Ashley Grace, Hanna Nicole and Yoel Henríquez while its production was done by Áureo Baqueiro. Is a song recorded by American duo Ha*Ash from her fourth studio album A Tiempo (2011). It was released as the third single from the album on January 2, 2012, by Sony Music Entertainment.

Commercial performance 
It peaked at #11 and #2 on Billboard Mexican Singles Chart, and at number #4 in the Monitor Latino.

Music video 
The first music video for "Todo No Fue Suficiente", recorded live for the album A Tiempo Edition Deluxe, was released on August 1, 2011. , the video has over 28 million views on YouTube.

The music video for was released on July 11, 2012 on the Ha*Ash's YouTube and the other video channels. , the video has over 160 million views on YouTube.

The third video for "Todo No Fue Suficiente", recorded live for the live album Ha*Ash: En Vivo, was released on December 6, 2019. The video was filmed in Auditorio Nacional, Mexico City.

Credits and personnel 
Credits adapted from AllMusic and Genius.

Recording and management

 Recording Country: United States
 Sony / ATV Discos Music Publishing LLC / Westwood Publishing
 (P) 2011 Sony Music Entertainment México, S.A. De C.V. (studio version)

Ha*Ash
 Ashley Grace  – vocals, guitar, songwriting
 Hanna Nicole  – vocals, guitar, songwriting
Additional personnel
 Yoel Henríquez  – songwriting
 Áureo Baqueiro  – director, arranger 
 Aaron Sterling  – drums

Charts

Awards and nominations

Release history

References 

Ha*Ash songs
Songs written by Ashley Grace
Songs written by Hanna Nicole
Songs written by Yoel Henriquez
Song recordings produced by Áureo Baqueiro
2011 songs
2012 singles
Spanish-language songs
Pop ballads
Sony Music Latin singles